Chicken tikka is a chicken dish originating in the Indian subcontinent during the Mughal era. The dish is popular in India, Bangladesh, Pakistan and the United Kingdom. It is traditionally small pieces of boneless chicken baked using skewers on a brazier called angeethi or over charcoal after marinating in Indian spices and dahi (yogurt)—essentially a boneless version of tandoori chicken. The word tikka (Tike in Turkish, and Tikə in Azerbaijani) is a Persian word, meaning "bits" or "pieces". It is also a chicken dish served in Punjabi cuisine. The Kashmiri version of the dish, however, is grilled over red-hot coals, and does not always contain boneless pieces. The pieces are brushed with ghee (clarified butter) at intervals to increase its flavour, while being continuously fanned. It is typically eaten with green coriander and tamarind chutney served with onion rings and lemon, or used in preparing a chicken tikka masala.

A chicken tikka sizzler is a dish where chicken tikka is served on a heated plate with onions. The dish is also popular in Afghanistan, though the Afghan variant (like many other Persian, Turkish, and Arab dishes) is less spicy compared to the variants in the Indian subcontinent and uses beef and lamb in addition to chicken.

Gallery

See also
Chicken Lollipop
North Indian cuisine
Paneer tikka
Pakistani meat dishes
Punjabi cuisine
Chicken tikka masala
Butter chicken
Çiğ köfte

References

Bangladeshi cuisine
Bengali cuisine
Indian cuisine
Indian chicken dishes
Pakistani cuisine
Pakistani chicken dishes
Grilled skewers
Baked foods